Goodbye, Columbus is the soundtrack to the 1969 movie of the same name (No. 99). It features four songs written and performed by The Association. The rest of the album consists of incidental music by composer Charles Fox. The title track reached No. 80 on Billboard's charts in early 1969.

The lead vocal on each of the four Association songs is performed by the song's writer, with the exception of the instrumental version of "Goodbye, Columbus", which features the entire group on lead vocals.

Track listing

References

The Association albums
Albums produced by John Boylan (record producer)
1969 soundtrack albums
Warner Records soundtracks
Comedy film soundtracks
Drama film soundtracks
Romance film soundtracks